Women's Town (Spanish: Pueblo de las mujeres) is a 1953 Spanish comedy film directed by Antonio del Amo and starring Marujita Díaz and Rubén Rojo.

Cast
 Marujita Díaz 
 Milagros Leal 
 Carmen Lozano 
 Matilde Muñoz Sampedro 
 José Prada 
 Antonio Riquelme 
 Rubén Rojo 
 Luisa Sala 
 Amparo Soler Leal

References

Bibliography
 De España, Rafael. Directory of Spanish and Portuguese film-makers and films. Greenwood Press, 1994.

External links 
 

1953 comedy films
Spanish comedy films
1953 films
1950s Spanish-language films
Films directed by Antonio del Amo
Films scored by Jesús García Leoz
Spanish black-and-white films
1950s Spanish films